Kevin Baggett (born May 3, 1966) is the current college basketball head coach for Rider University. He was promoted to his current position on May 12, 2012, following six years as an assistant and associate head coach at the school.

Head coaching record

References

1966 births
Living people
American men's basketball coaches
American men's basketball players
Basketball coaches from New Jersey
Basketball players from New Jersey
Coastal Carolina Chanticleers men's basketball coaches
College men's basketball head coaches in the United States
Howard Bison men's basketball coaches
James Madison Dukes men's basketball coaches
People from Burlington Township, New Jersey
Rider Broncs men's basketball coaches
Saint Joseph's Hawks men's basketball players
UMBC Retrievers men's basketball coaches
Western Kentucky Hilltoppers basketball coaches